Sirena (Mermaid) is a Venezuelan telenovela shown in 1993, starring with Astrid Gruber, Carlos Montilla, and Alejandro Delgado.Ralbin Duarte This telenovela contains 199 episodes.

Synopsis 
Loyalty and the passion, face in a circle of misfortunes without fin a young one to majer in Sirena. In this tragic history, the happiness and the single success can be achieved through the total treason. Desires and the instincts untie when the beautiful and rebellious Sirena Baltazar knows Adonis Diniz; whose wealth, power and enchantment, will mark the destiny of Sirena. Afraid of the dark intentions of Adonis, Sirena's house with Jasуn Mendoza, a famous tenista. Being disabled because of a mysterious accident, during the ceremony of his wedding, Jasуn it blames deeply to Adonis and Sirena. While Sirena faces the decision to be faithful to its marriage or the instincts of its heart, Adonis fights to conquer the love of her. Maintaining one it doubles secret life, Adonis tries to be playboy without scruples, at the same time that is hidden after the masked hero: "the Lynx", dedicating its life to the noblest aims, to clean to the name of its father and his fortune... and to make sure the love Sirena. The price that it will have to pay, could cost the life to him. Sirena develops in the middle of the condition, the emotion and it intrigues it, in an intense drama, where the passions and the secrets are as deep as the sea.

Cast 
 Astrid Gruber as Sirena Baltazar
 Carlos Montilla as Adonis Diniz
 Alejandro Delgado as Juan Hundre
 Ralbin Duarte as Evelio
 Miguel Ferrari as Jason
 Yoletti Cabrera as Frenesí
 Alexander Montilla as Eneas
 Maria Eugenia Perera as Tormento
 Ricardo Herranz as Rancho
 Roxana Diaz as Perfidia
 Joana Benedek as Joana "La Divina"
 Carolina Tejera
 Jorge Aravena as Orbick
 Ricardo Alamo
 Saul Marin as Lorenzo "GoGo"
 Betty Ruth as Guillermina
 Jorge Reyes
 Luis Alberto de Mozos as Amado Gross
 Alexander Espinoza
 Xavier Bracho as Mozart
 Yajaira Paredes
 Alexander Silva

References

1993 telenovelas
Venezuelan telenovelas
1993 Venezuelan television series debuts
1993 Venezuelan television series endings
Spanish-language telenovelas
Venevisión telenovelas
Television shows set in Venezuela